Zorile is a commune in Orhei District, Moldova. It is composed of three villages: Inculeț, Ocnița-Țărani and Zorile.

As of 2014, Zorile has a population of 899 people.

References

Communes of Orhei District